Heat Wave Drum & Bugle Corps is an Open Class competitive junior drum and bugle corps based in Tampa Bay, Florida. The corps is a member of Drum Corps International (DCI).

History

In June 2014, it was announced that a new drum and bugle corps was starting in west central Florida, based in Inverness. The hope was to be somewhat "old school," building both a cadet corps and a junior corps to march in DCI competition. It was also admitted that they were just getting started and had much work to do.

In January 2015, DCI announced that Heat Wave was one of five corps being evaluated for possible inclusion in DCI Open Class competition for 2015. On May 5, 2015, following a period of evaluation of the unit's finances, staffing, and tour plans by DCI's staff, Heat Wave, River City Rhythm, and Southwind were added to the list of competing Open Class corps. The corps was added to DCI's summer schedule for two shows in Alabama and Georgia.

In 2016, Heat Wave performed in seven DCI competitions in Alabama, Georgia, Mississippi, and Florida.

In 2017, the corps performed at five DCI competitions. For the first time since they began competing in 2015, they did not perform at the DCI Southeastern Championship. Although the corps did not attend Open Class Championships, they ended their season on July 19 in 18th place in overall Open Class.

In 2018, the corps made its first trip to the DCI World Championships in Indianapolis, IN, where they placed 40th overall at DCI World Championship Prelims.

In 2019, Heat Wave returned to Indianapolis after a scheduled tour of 18 shows, where they placed 14th in Open Class and 35th overall at DCI World Championship Prelims.

Sponsorship
Heat Wave of Florida is a 501(c)(3) musical organization that has a Board of Directors, Executive Director, and staff assigned to carry out the organization's mission. Ed Wackerle is President of the Board of Directors and Jeff Carstensen is the Corps Director.

Show summary (2015–2022)
Source:

References

External links
Official website

Drum and bugle corps
Drum Corps International Open Class corps
Musical groups established in 2014
Organizations based in Florida
2014 establishments in Florida